Pierre Laigle (born 9 September 1970 in Auchel, France) is a French former professional footballer. He played as a midfielder.

Laigle played for a number of Ligue 1 teams throughout his career, before retiring at the end of the 2006-07 season. He also played in Italy for Sampdoria, returning to his native country after relegation in the 1998–99 Serie A.

He was in France's preliminary squad of 28 players for the 1998 FIFA World Cup on home soil. However, he was one of six players dropped by head coach Aime Jacquet just before the tournament began. France went on to be victorious in the tournament and become national heroes.

Honours
 Coupe de la Ligue: 2000-01
 Ligue 1: 2001–02

References

External links
 http://www.sitercl.com/Fichejo/L/laiglepi.htm
 
 

1970 births
Living people
Association football midfielders
French footballers
French expatriate footballers
AS Saint-Priest players
France international footballers
RC Lens players
U.C. Sampdoria players
Olympique Lyonnais players
Montpellier HSC players
Serie A players
Ligue 1 players
Ligue 2 players
Expatriate footballers in Italy